The Rover 9 is a small car produced by Britain's Rover car company. It had a 1074 cc 9 fiscal horsepower four-cylinder engine. Manufactured from 1924 until 1927 it was first supplemented then replaced by Rover's 10-12 model.

Engine
A Mark Wild and staff designed 1074 cc water-cooled four-cylinder engine with overhead valves announced August 1924 supplemented then replaced the Rover 8 air-cooled twin and the new vehicle was named 9/20
The new engine with its clutch and gearbox are mounted as a unit to the mainframe at four points. z

Advertised by Rover as "The Nippy Nine" with emphasis on its water coolant circulated by pump, pressure lubricated engine, 3-speed gearbox and silent worm (rear) axle. "Super" models were supplied with rod-operated four-wheel brakes. Steering was by rack and pinion, worm and segment in the more expensive cars. At first the open 4-seater cars had just one door beside the front passenger's seat.

Bodywork
 Standard open 2-seater, open 4-seater tourer
 De Luxe  open 2-seater, open 4-seater tourer, fixed head coupé
 Super  open 2-seater, 4-seater, fixed head coupé and 4-door 4-seater Weymann saloon
 Sports 4-seater

The wheelbase was 104 inches and track 48 inches. The 4-seater sports had a 99-inch wheelbase.

Road test
The test car was the sports model with aluminium pistons, double valve springs, higher gear ratios and a lighter body. The car was considered to run pleasantly and do around 60 mph in top gear. When supplied for export the radiator is given a fan. There were complaints about accessibility for servicing and minor repairs. The engine was thought to be unusually smooth for a two-bearing product even at high speed. The steering wheel shook on rough roads otherwise controls were smooth and even. A final comment was "at the price one cannot fairly grumble at three speeds".

References

External links

9
Cars introduced in 1924